The National Arts Club is a 501(c)(3) nonprofit and members club on Gramercy Park, Manhattan, New York City. It was founded in 1898 by Charles DeKay, an art and literary critic of the New York Times to "stimulate, foster, and promote public interest in the arts and to educate the American people in the fine arts".  The National Arts Club has several art galleries, and hosts a variety of public programs in all artistic areas including theater, literature and music. Although the club is private, many of its events are free and open to the public.

Since 1906 the organization has occupied the Samuel J. Tilden House, a landmarked Victorian Gothic Revival brownstone at 15 Gramercy Park, next door to The Players, a club with similar interests. The National Arts Club allows members access to a Gramercy Park key. The Tilden House was designated a New York City landmark in 1966, and declared a National Historic Landmark in 1976. It is located in the Gramercy Park Historic District.

History

A group of friends, all of them involved in architecture, art, or civic affairs, discussed the possibility of a new kind of club that would embrace all the arts. The establishment of the Club came at a time when American artists were increasingly turning to their own nation rather than exclusively to Europe as a center of work and creativity. Significantly, the club would offer full membership for women at the onset, reflecting their accomplishment in the arts. While the group was working out an organizational plan, Charles DeKay, the literary and art critic of the New York Times for 18 years, returned from a diplomatic post abroad. An inspired organizer and entrepreneur, he sent letters to men and women of importance in the New York area as well as in metropolitan areas across the country. The response was so enthusiastic that the club was able to apply to Albany for its charter in 1898. With the application went a list of the officers, Board of Trustees, and members totaling more than 1200.

The list included such collectors as Henry Frick, William T. Evans, Benjamin Altman, Jules Bache and Henry Walters. Though not a charter member, J. Pierpont Morgan joined the Club early in its development and later was made an Honorary Vice President. Among the artists of the period, earlier charter members, or those joined in the early days of the club were Frederic Remington, William Merritt Chase, Robert Henri, and George Bellows.

The club's first home was a brownstone on West 34th Street. Commerce, meanwhile, was moving up from downtown, and the neighborhood of brownstones was changing. Spencer Trask, its treasurer, was asked to find the club a new home. He found that 14 and 15 Gramercy Park South, the former home of Samuel Tilden, was on the market. Legend has it that he was so afraid that some other buyer would also find it that he put down some money of his own to bind the bargain. In 1906, the club acquired the Samuel J. Tilden House.

During the 2006 restoration of the Tilden mansion's stoop, the Brazilian New York City artist Sergio Rossetti Morosini has now sculpted a bust of Michelangelo above the front door on the building's façade.

In 2018, Ben Hartley, an arts administrator, was appointed executive director of the club.

Members
The National Arts Club is one of the few private clubs that has admitted women as full and equal members since its inception.

Among the distinguished painters who have been members are Robert Henri, Leon Dabo, Edward Charles Volkert, Frederic Remington, William Merritt Chase, Richard C. Pionk, Chen Chi, Larry Rivers, Louise Upton Brumback, Cecilia Beaux, Will Barnet, Everett Raymond Kinstler, and Michael Cheval. Sculptors have been represented by Augustus Saint-Gaudens, Daniel Chester French, Anna Hyatt Huntington and Paul Manship. Many renowned literary figures, including Robert William Service in 1910, W. H. Auden, Mark Twain and Frank McCourt have been members. The National Arts Club is proud of its early recognition of new media art forms, like photography, film and digital media, and counts Alfred Stieglitz as one of its early members. Musicians Victor Herbert and Walter Damrosch were members, as were architects Stanford White, George B. Post, and Downing Vaux. George B. Post served as the first President of the National Arts Club.

The membership of the National Arts Club has included three Presidents of the United States: Theodore Roosevelt, Woodrow Wilson and Dwight Eisenhower along with Senator William A. Clark.

Permanent collection 
As of 2019, the club holds a permanent collection of 660 works of art including paintings, sculptures, and other works on paper. Artists represented in the collection include Daniel Putnam Brinley, Charles Courtney Curran, Daniel Garber, Philip Leslie Hale, Gari Melchers, William McGregor Paxton, Robert Spencer, Harry Willson Watrous, Robert Vonnoh, Everett Longley Warner, Robert Henri, Homer Boss, F. Luis Mora, Eugene Speicher, Jerry Farnsworth, Lamarr Dodd, Birge Harrison, Paul Cornoyer, Malvina Hoffman, Anna Hyatt Huntington, Lee Lawrie, Paul Manship, Victor Brenner, Will Barnet, Chen Chi, Peter Cox, Gary Erbe, Diana Kan, Everett Raymond Kinstler, Greg Wyatt, Carlos Quintana, Kendall Shaw, and Lois Dodd.

In keeping with its goal of supporting research in American art, the club frequently loans works from the collection to scholarly exhibitions presented by institutions and galleries such as the Florence Griswold Museum; the Thomas Walsh Gallery, Fairfield University; the Trout Gallery, Dickinson College; the Society of Illustrators, New York; and Berry-Hill Galleries, New York.

In 2019, the club partnered with the Google Cultural Institute to make many pieces from the collection available online.

Medal of Honor 
Since the early 1900s, the club has awarded its prestigious Medal of Honor to exemplary leaders in their respective artistic fields. Recipients of the award include WH Auden, Anthony Burgess, Eudora Welty, Tennessee Williams, Norman Mailer, Saul Bellow, Allen Ginsberg, John Updike, Marguerite Yourcenar, Iris Murdoch, Philip Roth, Salman Rushdie, Arthur Miller, Margaret Atwood, Toni Morrison, Nadine Gordimer, Tom Wolfe, Chinua Achebe, Don DeLillo, Joyce Carol Oates, Martin Amis, Salman Rushdie, John Ashbery, Leonard Bernstein, Alice Tully, Avery Fisher, Amyas Ames and the New York Philharmonic, Frederica von Stade, Benny Goodman, Isaac Stern, James Levine, Plácido Domingo, Itzhak Perlman, Paddy Moloney, Byron Janis, Ilse Bing, Manuel Alvarez Bravo, John Szarkowski, Inge Morath, George Kalinsky, R. Buckminster Fuller, I.M. Pei, Daniel Libeskind, Skidmore, Owings, and Merrill, Robert A. Stern, Eleanor Roosevelt, Salvador Dalí, Chen Chi, Louise Nevelson, Stewart Klonis and The Art Students League, Louise Bourgeois, Robert Rauschenberg, Will Barnet, Christo, Roy Lichtenstein, Dale Chihuly, Chuck Close, James Turrell, James Moody, Ed Ruscha, Spike Lee, Whoopi Goldberg, Richard Dreyfuss, John Turturro, Lynn Redgrave, Olympia Dukakis, Ang Lee, Lin-Manuel Miranda, Claire Bloom, Ellen Burstyn, Patricia Field, Jack O'Brien, Paul Auster, William Ivey Long, Dr. Neil DeGrasse Tyson, and Anna Sui.

Exhibitions 
The club hosts a rotating series of public art exhibitions in its galleries. Works by Pablo Picasso, Joan Míro, Ilya and Emilia Kabakov, Lissa Rivera, Andy Warhol, Keith Haring, and many other renowned artists have been featured in the space.

In December 2020, the Club presented Voices of the Soho Renaissance, the first exhibition of artwork born out of the calls for social justice which transformed New York City's Soho neighborhood, following the murders of George Floyd and Breonna Taylor. The show was followed by What Happened This Summer: ART2HEART, a second exhibition exploring the topic.

Societies within the club
Several smaller groups have existed within the National Arts Club:
 The Discus, a short-lived eating and debating club.
 The Vagabonds, a lunch group of writers, editors, printers, and illustrators. They met on Mondays in the grillroom of the Club. Members included Leon Dabo, Walter Alden Dyer, Henry James Forman, Alexander Harvey, Forbes Lindsay, Mathias Sandor, Harry Peyton Steger, Ryan Walker, Edward Jewitt Wheeler, Theodore Dreiser, Benjamin De Casseres, Marius de Zayas, and Andrew Carnegie, who "humorously deplored the fact that he was not a vagabond". In 1907, Harvey founded their magazine or pamphlet The Bang, which was published weekly until December 1917.
 The Men's Open Table, 1910-1950s, weekly dinners with a speaker.
 The Women's Open Table

References

External links 
 
 National Arts Club records at the Smithsonian Archives of American Art
National Arts Club within Google Arts & Culture

1898 establishments in New York City
American artist groups and collectives
Arts organizations established in 1898
Clubs and societies in New York City
Culture of New York City
Gentlemen's clubs in the United States
Gramercy Park
Organizations based in Manhattan
Gothic Revival architecture in New York City